Mieczysław Adamek (18 September 1918 – 18 May 1944) DFC was a Polish fighter ace of the Polish Air Force in World War II with 5 confirmed kills, 2 shared and 1 probable. He was awarded the Virtuti Militari, Poland's highest military decoration for heroism and courage in the face of the enemy at war, on 20 February 1941 and fought in the Polish Defensive War, the Battle of France, and the Allied invasion of continental Europe, before being killed in action on 18 May 1944.

Biography

Early life 
Mieczysław Adamek was born in Tashkent to Polish parents on 18 September 1918. After the end of World War I and the rebirth of the Polish State, Adamek returned to Poland with his family, where he grew up, graduating high school before attending the Crafts and Industrial School in Przemysl.

Flying career 
In 1936, he entered the Air Force Non-Commissioned Officer's School for minors in Bydgoszcz, Poland. After his graduation in 1939 he was assigned to the Polish 113th Fighter Escadrille. On the first day of World War II (1 September 1939) he scored a shared victory on a He 111. On 6 September, Adamek intercepted a number of Ju. 87 aircraft and, alongside his fellow pilots, shot one down. It has been reported that Adamek, with no fuel remaining in his aircraft, was forced to land next to the downed Ju. 87, and together with locals captured the Luftwaffe pilot. On 18 September, Adamek was evacuated to France via Romania. After training on a Bloch MB.150, Adamek took part in the Battle of France, flying under the orders of Commander Eugeniusz Wyrwcki in the 4th Polish Squadron. On 22 June 1940 he flew across the Mediterranean to Algiers, and then via Casablanca and Gibraltar reached Britain in July. After training in different British schools Adamek was posted to the No. 303 Polish Fighter Squadron. On 23 June 1941 he shot down a Bf 109 in a confirmed victory, and had a probable victory with another Bf 109.  Adamek shot down a further Bf 109 on 12 July 1941, and another on 12 October 1941. On 8 December 1941 he downed an Fw 190. The next year, on 14 April 1942, he shot down a Bf 109, this being his fifth individual victory, and enough to give him the honorary title of fighter ace.

In April 1943 he was transferred to No. 58 Operational Training Unit at RAF Grangemouth, Scotland where he served as an instructor. In November 1943 he was ordered to the No. 317 Polish Fighter Squadron, based at RAF Chailey in East Sussex, an Advanced Landing Ground designed to support the invasion of continental Europe by Allied Forces.

Death 
On 18 May 1944, while particIpating in a 'Ranger' mission over Fecamp, France as Flight Commander, Adamek's Spiftire Mk IX was hit by flak. Adamek struggled to maintain altitude and was unable to return to base at RAF Chailey. His squadron leader ordered him to abandon the aircraft, which Adamek did over the English Channel. However, his parachute became caught on the tail of his aircraft, and he drowned. There have also been unconfirmed rumours that Adamek was ultimately shot down by British anti-aircraft defences. It is not clear whether, if so, this was in addition to flak received over France, or the only hit the aircraft received that day.

Adamek is memorialised at a monument which can be found at RAF Chailey, alongside Flight Lieutenant Jan Kurowski of 308 Squadron, who was killed in action three days later. The monument carries a quote from Josef Chielnicki of RAF Poland: "A Nation will always live, if there are people ready to die". Adamek and Kurowski were the only two airmen to have been lost from this base.

Adamek is buried in Northwood Cemetery, London, UK.

Aerial victory credits

Confirmed kills
 1 / 4 He 111 - 1 September 1939
 1 / of 5 Ju 87 - 6 September 1939
 Bf 109 - 23 June 1941
 Bf 109 - 12 July 1941
 Bf 109 - 12 October 1941
 Fw 190 - 8 December 1941
 Bf 109 - 14 April 1942
Probable kill
 Bf 109 - 23 June 1941

Awards
 Virtuti Militari, Silver Cross
 Cross of Valour (Poland), four times
 Distinguished Flying Cross (United Kingdom)

References

Further reading
 
 
 Cumft O., Kujawa H. K., Księga lotników polskich 1939-1946, Wydawnictwo MON, Warszawa 1989.
 
 
 Tadeusz Jerzy Krzystek, Anna Krzystek: Polskie Siły Powietrzne w Wielkiej Brytanii w latach 1940-1947 łącznie z Pomocniczą Lotniczą Służbą Kobiet (PLSK-WAAF). Sandomierz: Stratus, 2012, p. 65. 
 Janusz Kubit: Szkoła Podoficerów Lotnictwa dla Małoletnich, Krosno 1938-1939. Krosno: Graffia - Agencja wydawniczo-fotograficzna, 2019 
 Piotr Sikora: Asy polskiego lotnictwa. Warszawa: Oficyna Wydawnicza Alma-Press. 2014, pp. 349–354. 
 Józef Zieliński: Asy polskiego lotnictwa. Warszawa: Agencja lotnicza ALTAIR, 1994, p. 60. ISBN 83862172.

Polish World War II flying aces
Recipients of the Silver Cross of the Virtuti Militari
1944 deaths
1918 births
Recipients of the Distinguished Flying Cross (United Kingdom)
Royal Air Force pilots of World War II
Royal Air Force personnel killed in World War II
Royal Air Force officers
Polish Air Force personnel